Crassula connata is a succulent plant in the family Crassulaceae. It is known by the common names sand pygmyweed and pygmy stonecrop. It is a very small plant which grows in patches on the ground, especially in rocky areas. It is also sometimes associated with vernal pool plant communities. The stems are a few centimeters in length and are covered with tiny fleshy pointed leaves. Each leaf is only millimeters long. The plant is green when new and it matures to shades of pink and red. It is found in western North America and in parts of Central and South America.

References

External links

USDA Plants Profile
Jepson Manual Treatment
Photo gallery

connata
Taxa named by Hipólito Ruiz López
Taxa named by José Antonio Pavón Jiménez
Taxa named by Alwin Berger